The Ford SHO V6 is a family of DOHC V6 engines fitted to the Ford Taurus SHO from 1989 to 1995. The designation SHO denotes Super High Output.  

Due to the engine's unusual and aesthetically pleasing appearance it is sometimes transplanted into other vehicles. Its distinctive variable length intake manifold is bilaterally symmetrical, so it can be rotated 180 degrees (making it face "backwards" on the engine, relative to its original installation orientation) to ease the engine's transition from transverse to longitudinal mounting.

The SHO engines share a common bell housing pattern with the following Ford engines: the 2.3/2.5 L FWD HSC I4, the 3.0 L FWD/RWD Vulcan V6, and the 3.8 L FWD Canadian Essex V6. In 1996, Ford discontinued the SHO V6 and began fitting the Taurus SHOs with the SHO 3.4 L V8 and the Ford AX4N automatic transmission.

Origin 
In 1984, executives of the Yamaha Motor Corporation signed a contract with the Ford Motor Company to develop, produce, and supply a compact 60° DOHC V6 engine based upon the existing Vulcan engine for transverse application.

There has been some confusion about the original intended use of the engine. It was thought this engine was first intended to power a mid-engine sports car, that project (known internally as GN34) was canceled. Patents have been found and pictures of prototype SHO powerplants installed in the Taurus show that the original intent was for the larger FWD setup and the GN34 would have come later. There were a few GN34 prototypes produced, most with standard Vulcan engines and a few other factory swaps, a SHO Ranger being one.

3.0 L 

The SHO V6 was a high-tech and revolutionary design when it debuted in 1988. Displacing , it was an iron block, aluminum head 24-valve DOHC engine with an innovative variable length intake manifold. Redline was marked on the tachometer at 7000 rpm, and fuel cut-off occurred at 7300 rpm. This engine was only available with the Ford MTX-IV transmission.

3.2 L 

From 1993 to 1995, the SHO engine was sold in two displacements: the existing  continued to be sold mated to the MTX-IV manual transmission, and a new  engine was sold mated to the Ford AX4S automatic transmission. Horsepower output was still , but now at 6000 rpm: This was due to a milder cam setup compared to the more aggressive intake camshaft in the  version.

Other Ford vehicles 

In 1989, with the help of Roush Racing, Ford Truck Public Affairs created a one-off Ford Ranger, dubbed the "SHO Ranger", with a  SHO V6 and a Mustang GT's T-5 manual transmission. According to D.A. "Woody" Haines, assistant manager of that division, they commissioned the project truck "to test the market."

In 1993, Ford Canada hand-built 40 Mercury Sables, some of which were powered by SHO V6 engines, as part of their AIV (Aluminum Intensive Vehicle) program and released 20 to the public. Using aluminum suspension elements and aluminum body panels, held together with spot welding and adhesive joining processes developed specifically for this vehicle, the end result was a car that was  lighter than a SHO Taurus. Multimatic Motorsports entered one of these vehicles in the 1995 One Lap of America event, finishing 15th overall and 1st in the Mid-Price class.

Modifications 

A popular modification to cars equipped with the  SHO engine is to replace the engine with a  engine. Further modification can include installing the cams from a  engine into a  engine.

SHOGun Festiva 
In 1990, Chuck Beck of Special Editions and Rick Titus took seven Ford Festivas and mounted  SHO V6s − still mated to their native transmissions − behind the front seats in mid-rear engine configuration. Along with substantial cosmetic body changes, including custom fiberglass wheel arches to accommodate a wider stance and larger tires, the suspension was completely redesigned. Each car was painted a different color. Two of the seven are notable; Jay Leno owns number 003 (the silver one), and number 005 (the purple one) included special modifications for competition in the SCCA, including a rollcage and 5-point restraints.

 One was destroyed in the 2021–2022 Boulder County fires.

Since the creation of these cars, others have imitated the idea by performing SHO-to-Festiva transplants of their own.

See also 
 Ford Taurus SHO
 Ford SHO V8 engine
 List of Ford engines
 List of Ford transmissions
 List of Ford bellhousing patterns

References 

SHO V6
SHO V6 engine
V6 engines
Gasoline engines by model